Eat'n Park is a restaurant chain based in Homestead, Pennsylvania. As of March 2023, the company operates 57 locations in Ohio, Pennsylvania, and West Virginia. The chain is known for its Smiley Cookies and has adopted the motto, "the place for smiles".

History

In the late 1940s, Larry Hatch and Bill Peters were supervisors at Isaly's Restaurants in Pittsburgh. On a trip to Cincinnati, Hatch was impressed seeing the Frisch's Big Boy Drive In operation. He and Peters contacted Big Boy founder Bob Wian, reaching a 25-year agreement to operate Big Boy Restaurants in the Pittsburgh area, which would be called Eat'n Park.

Eat'n Park launched on June 5, 1949, when Hatch and Peters opened a 13-stall drive-in restaurant on Saw Mill Run Boulevard in the Overbrook neighborhood of Pittsburgh. Advertised as "Pittsburgh's First Modern Eat-in-your-Car Food Service" this location was serviced by 10 carhops. Four months later, a second unit opened in Pittsburgh, by 1956: 11 units, 1960: 27 units, 1965: 30 units, and by 1973: 40 Eat'n Park locations. After leaving Big Boy, the chain entered Ohio and West Virginia, and eventually grew to over 75 restaurants. In 2017, there are 69 Eat'n Park restaurants operating.

Eat'n Park's early success had a direct impact on what would become the signature dish at McDonald's. It was designed to compete with the Big Boy hamburger Eat'n Park was offering at the time.

In 1974, Eat'n Park allowed their 25-year Big Boy franchise agreement to expire. This was publicly attributed to discontinuation of car hop servicewhich ended in 1971but it was largely motivated by the end of $1 per year licensing fee Eat'n Park enjoyed. As a result, the Big Boy hamburger was renamed the Superburger. The non-renewal of the Big Boy agreement eventually allowed Eat'n Park to expand into areas licensed to other Big Boy franchises. Eat'n Park expanded into Northeast Ohio including Greater Cleveland, Akron and Youngstown, and into West Virginia: first Morgantown, followed by Clarksburg and Wheeling. (In 1977, Big Boy reassigned the Pittsburgh territory to Wheeling-based Elby's Big Boy. Sold to Elias Brothers Big Boy in 1986, the Elby's locations closed in 2000 when Elias Brothers faced bankruptcy, the rights now owned by Big Boy Restaurant Group. The closest Big Boy restaurants operate in Greater Cleveland and Frisch's Big Boy restaurants in Heath and Lancaster, both near Columbus. In Morgantown and Clarksburg, Eat'n Park competes with fellow former Big Boy franchisee Shoney's.

The company launched its signature Smiley Cookie in 1986 to coincide with adding a bakery to its locations. The Smiley Cookie came from Warner's Bakery, a small bakery in Titusville, Pennsylvania. The Smiley Cookie would become so popular that it would eventually be added to its logo and would spawn the "Frownie" brownie from rival Kings Family Restaurants, which would be controversially discontinued in 2015 after Kings was sold to a private equity firm. Eat'n Park filed several lawsuits against companies outside the restaurants' operating area to enforce its trademark on the Smiley Cookie.

In 2011, Eat'n Park was awarded the Achievement of Excellence award from the American Culinary Federation.

Since 2013, Eat'n Park has been a sponsor of the YouTube series Pittsburgh Dad.

Former locations 

While Eat'n Park currently serves western Pennsylvania, eastern Ohio and northern West Virginia, the chain also served the Harrisburg, Lancaster, and York, Pennsylvania markets from the mid-1990s to 2010.  At one time having operated five restaurants in the Harrisburg market alone, by 2010 only one remained in Harrisburg, and one each in New Cumberland, Lancaster, and York. In March 2010, the New Cumberland and Lancaster locations were closed and sold, and by October 1, 2010 Eat'n Park closed their last two area restaurantsin York and Harrisburgdue to low sales.

On October 4, 2015, Eat'n Park closed one restaurant in State College, Pennsylvania after operating for 24 years due to a decline in sales.

On January 17, 2019, Eat'n Park announced it was closing six restaurants due to under-performing sales. Four were in Greater Cleveland, while the other two were in Boardman, Ohio and New Castle, Pennsylvania, both in close proximity to Youngstown, Ohio. Eat'n Park will continue to operate its three other Youngstown-area locations. Although this removed the Eat'n Park brand from the Cleveland area, the company continues to operate a Cleveland area Hello Bistro restaurant with plans to open a second unit.

On January 27, 2019, Eat'n Park closed one of the two restaurants in Erie, Pennsylvania. Having operated for 29 years, the building will be demolished and a Chick-fil-A restaurant constructed on the site.

On June 16, 2019, Eat’n Park in McKees Rocks, Pennsylvania, closed its doors after 53 years. The building was subsequently torn down.

Other concepts
Eat'n Park has been expanding its offerings outside its namesake family restaurants, operating upscale restaurants as well as more casual eating places.

The company's most successful concept is Hello Bistro, a fast casual chain focused on millennials offering gourmet burgers and salads while keeping its parent company ties to a minimum by offering prepackaged Smiley Cookies and the same brand of ranch dressing as the main Eat'n Park chain, but otherwise making no references to Eat'n Park. With six locations, Eat'n Park plans to expand the Hello Bistro concept throughout the Pittsburgh metropolitan area and potentially into new markets.

Eat'n Park Hospitality Group

Eat'n Park Hospitality Group is a portfolio of foodservice concepts focused on personalized dining and winner of the National Restaurant Association's 2011 Restaurant award.

Smoking
Eat'n Park banned smoking throughout the chain on May 30, 2007, sixteen months before a statewide smoking ban was enacted in Pennsylvania.

Christmas commercial
A Christmas tradition in the Pittsburgh region is the annual airing of an animated Eat'n Park commercial that shows a Christmas star (named Sparkle) struggling to reach the top of a Christmas tree until the tree bends over to help the star up. Released in 1982, in support of a charity at Children's Hospital of Pittsburgh, the commercial became so popular that Eat'n Park has re-aired the ad every year since, starting in late November. Eat'n Park now sells merchandise during the holiday season based on the ad. It is believed to be the longest-running Christmas commercial in the US, longer than national television ads by Folgers, Hershey's Kisses, and M&M's, as well as a regional commercial by the Pennsylvania Lottery. Sparkle, the Eat'n Park Star was trademarked by Eat'n Park in 1990 but was abandoned two years later.

References

External links

Smiley Cookie website

Economy of the Eastern United States
Regional restaurant chains in the United States
1949 establishments in Pennsylvania
Restaurants established in 1949
Big Boy Restaurants